Tom Byron (born Thomas Bryan Taliaferro Jr.; April 4, 1961) is an American former pornographic actor, director, and producer. A member of the XRCO and the AVN Halls of Fame, he was voted #20 in AVN's list of top 50 pornstars of all time.

Early life
Byron is of Italian descent and was raised in Orange, Texas. He attended Stark High School and later West Orange-Stark high school where he graduated in 1979. He is an alumnus of the University of Houston.

Acting
Byron first started acting in hardcore films in May 1982, and continued to perform mostly in roles portraying doctors or "coming of age" scenarios, as he resembled a teenager even though he was in his early to mid-20s. He starred alongside the underage Traci Lords in many films including her porn debut in early 1984, What Gets Me Hot!. He performed with porn legend Ginger Lynn in her second-ever scene, and claims that experience convinced the actress to remain in porn after her first scene with Ron Jeremy had her contemplating quitting the business. "America, you have me to thank for Ginger Lynn", Byron has said. 

In porn's 1980s heyday, Byron says that pills such as Viagra didn't yet exist to help male performers, and many including himself regularly smoked cannabis before filming as a means of getting in the mood. Byron did, however, begin to turn to pills for help later in his career. "Viagra kept me in the game for at least ten years after my due date", he says. 

He was rumored to have had an ongoing off-screen relationship with Lords in the mid-80s, though in the years since he has alternately downplayed their relationship and admitted that he had been in love with her. He says he "fell hard" in love with porn actress Jill Kelly in the early 90s before she married Cal Jammer. Byron also dated porn actress Tera Patrick early in her career.  

He has changed his image several times throughout his career, frequently portraying a clean-shaven, adolescent virgin in his early years in porn. His late 1980s long-haired hard rock persona was no pretense, as Byron was at that time moonlighting as a struggling hard rock musician in Hollywood with hopes of a legitimate career in music. In 1986, he released a music video for his song "Cat Alley". By the early 1990s, Byron again changed his persona and appearance to that of a clean-cut "businessman" type.

Near the end of his career, Byron also acted under the “dirty old man” persona.

Byron says Jamie Summers was his all-time favorite co-star, citing her "amazing pussy". He lists Jada Stevens and Gia Derza as his favorite current performers, though he retired before he had an opportunity to work with either of them.

In August 2003, Byron announced his retirement from performing to focus on his directing career. However, in the fall of 2006, after just three years, he returned to performing in numerous scenes, most notably his House of Ass series for his own company, Evolution Erotica. 

In February 2007, he founded Tom Byron Pictures. In December 2012, he announced that he was no longer part of this first company, and was forming a second, Tom Byron Company.

Post-retirement
Byron currently resides in upstate New York. He says that a return to performing in porn is extremely unlikely, as age has caught up with him and he currently has problems maintaining an erection. "What am I... 59 now? I'm done! It's all over with," he said. 

In 2020, Byron revealed that he is busy writing his autobiography with the help of author Mike Sager, whose work inspired the award-winning 1997 motion picture Boogie Nights. Byron has said there is already interest in turning his story into a major motion picture.

Filmography
Byron appeared in about 3,200 videos in his pornographic career, making him the most credited actor in the Internet Adult Film Database.

His earliest video that can be dated with certainty is Anything Goes from 1982. Other videos include the Asseaters Unanimous series.

Awards

References

External links

 
 
 
 

1961 births
American male pornographic film actors
American pornographic film directors
American pornographic film producers
Living people
People from Houston
Pornographic film actors from Texas
University of Houston alumni
Film directors from Texas
American people of Italian descent